John Avalos is an American politician. He served two terms as a member of the San Francisco Board of Supervisors from 2008 to 2016. Avalos represented District 11 in San Francisco, consisting of the Crocker-Amazon,  Excelsior, Ingleside, Oceanview, and Outer Mission districts. Avalos was elected on November 4, 2008 in the 2008 San Francisco election and took office on January 8, 2009. He was re-elected in  the 2012 San Francisco election with 94 percent of the vote, and termed out of office in January 2017.

Early life and education

Avalos is Mexican-American/Chicano, and was born in Wilmington, California. Along with his
three brothers and two sisters, he was raised by his mother Erlinda, an office worker, and his
father Hector, a longshoreman and member of the International Longshore and Warehouse
Union. His parents divorced when he was young, and his mother cared for them on her own. Avalos moved to Andover, Massachusetts as a teenager and graduated from Andover High School in 1982.

After graduating from Andover, Avalos moved back to California, where he soon attended the
University of California, Santa Barbara and earned a bachelor’s degree in English. In 1989,
Avalos moved to San Francisco, California where he later earned a Masters in Social Work from
San Francisco State University.

Early political and community organizing work

After college, Avalos worked as a social worker, educator, and mental health counselor for
community organizations including the San Francisco Conservation Corps, Columbia Park Boys
and Girls Club, Mission Neighborhood Health Center, the Youth Leadership Institute, and
Coleman Advocates for Children and Youth. He was trained in youth development, community organizing and media advocacy. Avalos also led programs providing employment, education, and leadership opportunities for youth; and promoted policies to reverse the tracking and incarceration of youth into the prison-industrial complex.

Avalos served as the Political Director of Coleman Advocates for Children and Youth,
developing strategies for progressive taxation and leading the campaign to reauthorize the City
of San Francisco’s Children’s Fund charter mandate. Following Coleman, Avalos began labor
organizing for the Justice for Janitors Campaign for the Service Employees International Union (SEIU) Local 1877 (now SEIU United Service Workers West). While there, he ran the political program for the South Bay region and rebuilt the residential janitorial and door worker program in San Francisco.

San Francisco supervisor

Before being elected to the Board of Supervisors, Avalos served for four years as a legislative
aide for supervisor Chris Daly. He focused on the city budget and municipal financing, playing a key role in addressing waste in public safety departments and expanding and safeguarding resources for affordable housing, homelessness services, youth and senior services, community violence prevention programs, and immigrant services. He was instrumental in developing new health and human services and other safety net programs, such as the San Francisco Immigrant Legal and Education Network (SFILEN) in 2006 to address emerging needs in poor, immigrant, and working-class communities.   

On November 4, 2008, Avalos was elected to the San Francisco Board of Supervisors. Under the City’s instant-runoff voting system, Avalos won the election for District 11 supervisor with
28.23% of the total votes in round one and 52.93% in round four. Avalos ran on a platform of community development, affordable housing, immigrant rights and humane policing. His grassroots campaign involved hundreds of volunteers, and refused support from developers, real estate interests and lobbyists.

Budgeting and municipal finance 

As Supervisor, Avalos focused on municipal budgeting and finance, emphasizing fair budgeting
and progressive taxation. Avalos chaired the Budget and Finance Committee in 2009 and 2010, at a time when San Francisco experienced a $500 million deficit each of those years.
Avalos reversed tens of millions of dollars in cuts to safety net services and prevented the privatization and outsourcing of janitorial services at City Hall, security services in city-run museums and jail health services.

In 2010, Avalos passed legislation to set a 5-cent fee per serving of alcohol to raise funding for
emergency services in response to alcohol consumption. The legislation would have generated
new revenue to recover millions of dollars in city costs for alcohol-related services, but Mayor
Gavin Newsom vetoed the bill and Avalos failed to garner the eight votes to override the veto.

In 2010, Avalos crafted an increase to San Francisco’s Real Estate Transfer Tax for properties
valued over $5,000,000 and $10,000,000. Voters approved his proposal, Proposition N, on
November 2, 2010. Prop N has since raised hundreds of millions of dollars in revenue for the
City.

In 2012, Avalos worked with Mayor Ed Lee to update the City’s business tax by creating a
progressive gross receipts tax that included an exemption for small and low-profit businesses.
The final ordinance that the Board of Supervisors placed on the ballot generated millions more in new revenue than the Mayor’s revenue-neutral measure, raising $32 million annually subject to the consumer price index. The new revenues ensured funding for the Affordable Housing Trust Fund that passed on the same ballot.

In 2015, Avalos challenged Mayor Lee’s $250 million housing bond by crafting a measure
which resulted in the Mayor increasing his bond to $310 million. The larger bond enabled
affordable housing projects to be financed in greater amounts in District 11 and District 9 than
under Mayor Lee’s original plan. The new revenues ensured funding for the Affordable Housing Trust Fund that passed on the same ballot.

Employment and local hiring 

In December 2010, working with a coalition of labor and Black, Brown, and Asian community
organizations, Avalos passed the strongest Local Hiring Ordinance in the country. The
ordinance was crafted during the great recession years at a time when San Francisco had one of its highest unemployment rates in decades. Since the 1990’s, the City relied on a nonbinding local hiring ordinance called First Source, which never achieved measurable success. Avalos’ Local Hiring Ordinance is based on the principle that public spending and development should benefit local residents and disadvantaged workers. The ordinance targeted neighborhoods with the highest rates of unemployment.

The Local Hiring Ordinance required publicly funded contractors to hire local residents starting
at a rate of 20% for each trade working on a project, rising by 5% each year up to 50%. Despite
early opposition from the Building Trades Council, the ordinance went to a local resident hiring
rate of more than 50% after six years. Avalos later expanded the ordinance to apply to private development on public land.

Criminal and environmental justice 

In his second term in office and in his role as a director of the Bay Area Air Quality Management District (BAAQMD), Avalos championed environmental initiatives such as Clean Power SF, the City’s renewable power program, and worked to adopt the BAAQMD’s 10 Point Climate Action Program.

In 2013, Avalos initiated an effort to convince the San Francisco Employees Retirement System Board to divest from fossil fuel corporations. Avalos also worked on opposition to the Keystone XL Pipeline and rulemaking to limit emissions from petroleum refineries, particularly around working class communities of color. 

In 2016, Avalos sponsored and passed the Keep It in the Ground Ordinance banning the use of San Francisco public land for fossil fuel extraction and setting in motion the closure of Chevron oil drilling on City-owned land in Kern River Oil Field in Kern County, California.

Immigrants rights 

In 2013 Avalos updated the City’s Sanctuary City status by passing the Due Process for All
Ordinance in response to the Federal Immigration and Customs Enforcement Agency’s Secure
Communities or S-Comm program. The measure sought to prohibit unconstitutional detention of any person in San Francisco law enforcement custody beyond his or her release date at the request of immigration officials. The measure also sought to limit involvement by local law enforcement with S-Comm, which has resulted in thousands of deportations nationwide, dividing families and fracturing communities. The Secure Communities Program was criticized for creating a dragnet wherein even U.S. citizens were detained, and was finally terminated in 2014 and replaced with the Priority Enforcement Program.  In 2016, Avalos introduced legislation to set a common standard between San Francisco’s landmark Sanctuary City Ordinance and the Due Process for All Ordinance.

Community development and municipal banking 
As supervisor, Avalos devoted much of his work to supporting District 11 residents’ efforts to shape their community’s future. His office funded neighborhood planning efforts that led to the City setting aside land for transit-oriented affordable housing. Avalos’ efforts to address community workforce development needs led to the creation of a workforce center in District 11 focusing on employment development and enforcement of workers’ rights.
Avalos supported District 11 community efforts to develop urban agriculture and community gardening projects.
In other district initiatives, Avalos helped foster community-led grant making programs; neighborhood art projects in which neighborhood artists created murals, public plazas, and sculptures; and new walkways, stairs, and pathways in neighborhood parks and open spaces. 

In 2010, Avalos passed legislation affirming the Ocean Avenue Community Benefit Initiative, supporting years of community effort and setting Ocean Ave on a stronger trajectory of sustainable neighborhood serving economic growth. Despite limited economic growth in the southern neighborhoods of District 11, in 2015 Avalos succeeded in bringing a branch of the San Francisco Federal Credit Union to the Excelsior District. 

During the Great Recession years and afterwards, rates of mortgage defaults and foreclosures were particularly high in San Francisco’s south and southeastern neighborhoods. Avalos worked with the Association of California Communities for Empowerment (ACCE) to occupy homes where households face evictions after struggling to modify their mortgages. With ACCE, Avalos advocated at local and federal levels to create home loan principal reduction programs,and to strengthen community development financial institutions’ leverage to address foreclosure and enable households to modify their mortgage with principal reduction. 

Following the 2008-09 recession and the home loan crisis, starting in 2011, Avalos championed
the idea of a Municipal Bank for San Francisco. In 2012, Avalos began the city’s process of
studying the creation of a public bank.
In 2016, San Francisco supervisors unanimously
passed legislation by Avalos cutting ties with Wells Fargo, following the bank’s “phony
accounts” scandal. San Francisco supervisors approved a resolution in 2019 urging California lawmakers to allow the city to create its own public bank.

2011 San Francisco mayoral campaign

On April 18, 2011, Avalos filed to run for mayor of San Francisco as a progressive candidate. Avalos placed second in the race after incumbent Mayor Ed Lee.

On January 18, 2019, the San Francisco Ethics Commission fined Avalos $12,146 for failing to properly disclose campaign finances from his unsuccessful run for mayor in 2011. According to the Ethics Commission, Avalos’ campaign committee improperly reported $26,506 — or 11 percent — of his total contributions. The committee also failed to maintain complete records for $391,594 worth of expenditures, 60 percent of the total amount of money spent. Avalos accepted the settlement in front of the commission.

Personal life
Avalos was married to Karen Zapata, a public-school teacher, and they have two children. They separated in 2014, the same year Avalos revealed he had a romantic relationship with his former colleague and legislative aide, Raquel Redondiez. Avalos and Zapata divorced in 2017. They continue to co-parent their children. Avalos married Raquel Redondiez in June 2022.

References

San Francisco Board of Supervisors members
Mexican-American people in California politics
1964 births
Living people
21st-century American politicians
California Democrats
People from Wilmington, Los Angeles
University of California, Santa Barbara alumni
San Francisco State University alumni